Dysodia zellerii is a species of moth of the family Thyrididae.

Distribution
This species is found in Angola, Cameroon, Nigeria, Sierra Leone and Uganda.

References
Dewitz, 1881. Afrikanische Nachtschmetterlinge. Nova acta Leopoldina Bd. 42, no. 2

Thyrididae
Moths described in 1881
Moths of Africa
Taxa named by Hermann Dewitz